IRIB Pooya & Nahal (شبکه کودک و نوجوان, Shibkâh-e Kudâk vâ Nuju'l, in Persian), is an Iranian state-owned children's Television channel owned by the Islamic Republic of Iran Broadcasting.

History of the Channel
The channel was established on July 18, 2012, as IRIB Pooya, and reformed on September 23, 2015.

The channel consists of two subchannels, Pooya, launched on September 23, 2015, which is broadcast daily from 8 a.m. to 2 p.m., targets a younger audience, mainly consisting of six years and below. Nahal (which means plant in Persian), launched on September 23, 2015, as IRIB Koodak, but renamed and rebranded on April 18, 2016, broadcast everyday from 7.30 p.m., primarily targets older children. On September 20, 2016, Omid (meaning hope), a sister television channel targeted towards adolescents, was launched.

Gallery

Programming

Programming (IRIB Pooya) 
 3000 Leagues in Search of Mother
 Lamput
Mickey Mouse Clubhouse
 Animal Mechanicals
 Babaei
 Ben & Holly's Little Kingdom
 Bing
 Pepee
 Blaze and the Monster Machines
 Boo!
 Caillou
 Chuggington
 Daniel Tiger's Neighborhood
 Dig and Dug
 Digimon Adventure
 Driver Dan's Story Train
 Fifi and the Flowertots
 Footy Pups
 Henry Hugglemonster
 Hi-5 (season 17)
 In the Night Garden...
 Kikoriki
 Littlest Pet Shop 
 My Little Pony: Friendship Is Magic
 Masha and the Bear
 Maya the Bee (TV series)
 Miss Spider's Sunny Patch Friends
 Molang
 Monk Little Dog
 Musti
 Numberblocks
 Pocoyo
 Percy’s Tiger Tales
 Poppets Town
 PAW Patrol
 Rugrats
 Sarah and Duck
 Show Me Show Me
 SpongeBob SquarePants
 Super Wings
 Teletubbies
 The Octonauts
 The Prince of Tennis
 Uki
 Waybuloo
 Robotboy

Programming (IRIB Nahal) 
 Mouk
 Mia the Mouse
 Shaun the Sheep
 Vicky the Viking
 Buttercup Wood
 Postman Pat
 Roary the Racing Car
 Timon & Pumbaa
 The Looney Tunes Show
 Numb Chucks
 Bunsen Is a Beast
 Turbo F.A.S.T.
 Camp Lazlo
 Jimmy Two-Shoes
 Homestar Runner
 Teenage Mutant Ninja Turtles
 Oggy and the Cockroaches
 Pat & Mat
 Kamen Rider OOO
 Space Goofs
 The Garfield Show
 Geronimo Stilton
 Animaniacs
 Digimon Adventure
 Pingu
 AI Football GGO
 The Boss Baby: Back in Business
 Rugrats
 Oddbods
 Fireman Sam
 We Bare Bears
 PJ Masks
 Kings of Atlantis
 Doraemon the Movie 2017: Great Adventure in the Antarctic Kachi Kochi
 Hilda (TV series)
 Molly of Denali
 The Prince of Tennis
 Kid vs. Kat
 Titeuf

External links

IRIB Pooya Official website
IRIB Nahal Official website
IRIB Pooya & Nahal Live streaming

Television stations in Iran
Persian-language television stations
Islamic Republic of Iran Broadcasting
Television channels and stations established in 1994
Mass media in Tehran
Children's television networks
1994 establishments in Iran
Preschool education television networks
Classic television networks
Anime companies